The Czech passport (pas) is an international travel document issued to nationals of the Czech Republic, and may also serve as proof of Czech citizenship. Besides enabling the bearer to travel internationally and serving as indication of Czech citizenship, the passport facilitates the process of securing assistance from Czech consular officials abroad or other European Union member states in case a Czech consular is absent, if needed.

 Czech citizens had visa-free or visa on arrival access to 186 countries and territories, ranking the Czech passport 7th overall in terms of travel freedom according to the Henley Passport Index. and 4th in passport index https://www.passportindex.org/.  Czech citizens can live and work in any country within the EU as a result of the right of free movement and residence granted in Article 21 of the EU Treaty.

Every Czech citizen is also a citizen of the European Union. The nationality allows for free rights of movement and residence in any of the states of the European Union, Switzerland and the European Economic Area, but a passport or a national identity card is in practice needed for identification.

Application
The passport is issued by the Interior Ministry (Ministerstvo vnitra), and as is internationally customary remains property of the Czech Republic and can be withdrawn at any time. It is a valid Proof of Citizenship document according to the Czech nationality law. Citizens can hold multiple passports at the same time, and children can be included in the passport. The Ministry of Foreign Affairs sporadically issues a list of nations with visa-free travel arrangements with the Czech Republic.

In an application for a Czech passport, one must submit two photographs of 35mm x 45mm size.

Physical appearance
Czech passports are burgundy like other passports of the European Union, with the Czech coat of arms emblazoned in the centre of the front cover. The words "EVROPSKÁ UNIE" and "ČESKÁ REPUBLIKA" are inscribed above the coat of arms and the words "CESTOVNÍ PAS" are inscribed below the coat of arms. Czech passports adhere to the common EU design and International Civil Aviation Organization requirements

Identity information page

 Photo of passport holder
 Type (P)
 Code (CZE)
 Passport no.
 01 Surname
 02 Given names
 03 Nationality (Česká republika/Czech Republic)
 04 Date of birth
 05 Place of birth
 06 Sex
 07 Date of issue
 08 Date of expiry
 09 Authority
 10 Holder's signature
 11 Personal no.

The lower area of the data page contains the Machine-readable zone.

Passport note

Passports typically contain a message from the minister or official in charge of passport issuance addressed to the officials of foreign states, requesting that the citizen bearing the passport be allowed free passage through the state, and if in need be provided assistance consistent with international norms. Today this treatment is expected rather than requested, but the message remains as a tradition. Czech passports bear this message only in Czech, in capitals and as follows:
Držitel českého cestovního pasu je pod ochranou České republiky. Všichni, jichž se to může týkat, se žádají, aby v případě potřeby poskytli držiteli tohoto pasu nezbytnou pomoc a ochranu podle mezinárodního práva.
The above message when unofficially rendered in English, would read:
The holder of a Czech passport is under the protection of the Czech Republic. All those whom it may concern are hereby requested to, in times of need, render the holder of this passport all essential help and protection under international law.

Languages
The data page is printed in Czech, English and French, followed a few pages later with translations to all remaining official EU languages and Russian.

Visa requirements

 Czech citizens had visa-free or visa on arrival access to 186 countries and territories, ranking the Czech passport 7th overall in terms of travel freedom according to the Henley Passport Index.

History

Non-machine-readable passports
These series have become obsolete and are only issued for emergency reasons due to more expedient processing.

1993 passport series

The first passport of the Czech Republic, issued between the dissolution of Czechoslovakia and 31/3/2000, with a ten-year validity.

The data page is inside the back cover and printed in Czech and English. The photograph is attached with adhesive. These features remain constant for all non-machine readable passports

1998 passport series

Issued:
 from 2000 until 30/6/2000 with a ten-year validity
 from 1/7/2000 until 31/8/2006 with a one-year validity
 from 1/9/2006 until 31/12/2006 with a six-month validity, or for citizens under five years of age with a one year validity

2005 passport series

Issued:
 from 2005 until 31/8/2006 with a one-year validity
 from 1/9/2006 until 31/12/2009 with a six-month validity, or for citizens under five years of age with a one year validity

2007 passport series

Issued from February 2007 with a six-month validity, or for citizens under five years of age with a one-year validity.

Machine-readable passports

2000 passport series

Issued from 1/7/2000 until 15/3/2005 with a ten-year validity, or for citizens under fifteen years of age with a five-year validity.

The data page is inside the back cover and printed in Czech and English. The photograph is printed onto the page.

2005 passport series

Issued from 16/3/2005 until 31/8/2006 with a ten-year validity, or for citizens under fifteen years of age with a five-year validity.

As the first passport series issued following Czech ascension into the European Union, it is first to bear the words "Evropská Unie" and has been modified to conform to standard EU passport design. The data page was moved to page two, and French was added. Pages six and seven now bear translations of the data fields into eighteen languages of the European Union and Russian.

2006 passport series

Issued from 1/9/2006 with a ten-year validity, or for citizens under fifteen years of age with a five-year validity.

The 2006 series was the first biometric passport issued by the Czech Republic. The data page is now printed on a polycarbonate card and the photograph is laser-etched.

2009 passport series
In March 2009 a new series begun to be issued. The most notable change is the addition of two fingerprints, one from the index finger on each hand in order to conform to new EU regulations.

Service passports
Issuable to:
 the Supreme Public Prosecutor of the Czech Republic
 the deputy Supreme Public Prosecutor of the Czech Republic
 deputy ministers of the Government of the Czech Republic
 the vice-president of the Supreme Court of the Czech Republic
 the vice-president of the Supreme Audit Office of the Czech Republic
 the clerk of the Chamber of Deputies of the Czech Republic
 the clerk of the Senate of the Czech Republic
 the clerk of the Government of the Czech Republic
 the clerk of the President of the Czech Republic
 employees of the Ministry of Foreign Affairs
 employees of the embassies and consulates of the Czech Republic

1993 Service passport series

The first service passport issued after the dissolution of Czechoslovakia.

2002 Service passport series

With the entry of the Czech Republic into the European Union in 2004 this is no longer the current series issued.

Diplomatic passports
Issuable to:
 the President of the Czech Republic (and former presidents)
 ministers of the Government of the Czech Republic
 members of the Parliament of the Czech Republic
 justices of the Constitutional Court of the Czech Republic
 the president of the Supreme Administrative Court of the Czech Republic
 the president of the Supreme Court of the Czech Republic
 the president of the Supreme Audit Office of the Czech Republic
 the spouse of:
 the President of the Czech Republic
 the Speaker of the Chamber of Deputies of the Parliament of the Czech Republic
 the President of the Senate of the Parliament of the Czech Republic
 ministers of the Government of the Czech Republic
 the president of the Supreme Administrative Court of the Czech Republic
 the president of the Supreme Court of the Czech Republic
 the chief justice of the Constitutional Court of the Czech Republic
 diplomatic staff

1993 Diplomatic passport series

The first diplomatic passport issued after the dissolution of Czechoslovakia.

2001 Diplomatic passport series

With the entry of the Czech Republic into the European Union in 2004 this is no longer the current series issued.

See also
Foreign relations of the Czech Republic
List of passports
Passports of the European Union
Visa requirements for Czech citizens

References

Passports by country
Law of the Czech Republic
European Union passports